Kellye Nakahara Watson (January 16, 1948 – February 16, 2020) was an American actress, best known for playing Nurse Kellye in 167 episodes of the television comedy series M*A*S*H.

Life and career
Nakahara was born in Honolulu. Before becoming an actress, Nakahara moved to San Francisco to pursue a career in art. In 1967, she married David Wallett and moved to Los Angeles where she began a career as an actress. Halfway through the first season of M*A*S*H, she landed the part of Nurse Kellye; she appeared in 167 episodes of the long-running series. Following the series finale of M*A*S*H, Nakahara appeared in television commercials as a spokesperson for IBM. Additionally, she appeared in several other television shows, had a small part in the films Clue (1985) as Mrs. Ho, the domestic cook, and in 1995's Black Day Blue Night. She also played a labor and delivery nurse in the 1988 John Hughes film She's Having a Baby.

Nakahara was also a watercolor artist, who painted and exhibited under her married name, Kellye Wallett.

Death
Nakahara died from cancer at her home in Pasadena, California, on February 16, 2020.

Filmography

References

External links

 Interview with Kellye Nakahara
 Kellye Wallett Studio
 2016 Interview with Kellye Nakahara
 Death Announcement

1948 births
2020 deaths
20th-century American actresses
21st-century American painters
Actresses from Honolulu
Actresses from Pasadena, California
American television actresses
American watercolorists
Artists from Pasadena, California
Deaths from cancer in California
Painters from Hawaii
Women watercolorists
21st-century American actresses